"" was the national anthem of Nicaragua from 1893 until 1910.

The anthem was dedicated to General José Santos Zelaya, and was adopted as the national anthem in September 1893. The music was composed by Alejandro Cousin (father-in-law of General Zelaya), who also composed the 1889-1893 national anthem. The author is not exactly known, but it was probably written by one of three poets: Rubén Darío, Santiago Argüello or Manuel Maldonado. Although replaced in 1910, "Hermosa Soberana" is still popular as a patriotic song. "Hermosa Soberana" is still the partisan anthem of the Liberal Party which governed Nicaragua from 1927 to 1979 and from 1997 to 2006.

After the failure of last liberal revolution in 1910, it was replaced by a more peaceful-like "Salve a ti, Nicaragua" in accordance with the peace spirit of a country that had just ended a series of civil wars.

Lyrics

References

External links
Complicated history of national anthems of Nicaragua
MP3 file (vocal) of Hermosa Soberana

Historical national anthems
Spanish-language songs
Nicaraguan songs
North American anthems
National symbols of Nicaragua